Zoopark-1 1L219 is a counter-battery radar system developed jointly by Almaz-Antey for the Russian Armed Forces. It is a mobile passive electronically scanned array radar (based on a tracked MT-LBu chassis) for the purpose of enemy  field-artillery acquisition. The system can detect moving ground targets at a distance of up to 40 kilometers. It reached initial operating status in 1989.

See also 
 Penicillin (counter-artillery system)
 AN/TPQ-36 Firefinder radar
 AN/TPQ-37 Firefinder radar
 Swathi Weapon Locating Radar
 Aistyonok
 COBRA (radar)

References

Ground radars
Weapon Locating Radar
Russian and Soviet military radars
Warning systems
Almaz-Antey products
Military vehicles introduced in the 1980s